In algebraic geometry, the dualizing sheaf on a proper scheme X of dimension n over a field k is a coherent sheaf  together with a linear functional

that induces a natural isomorphism of vector spaces

for each coherent sheaf F on X (the superscript * refers to a dual vector space). The linear functional  is called a trace morphism.

A pair , if it is exists, is unique up to a natural isomorphism. In fact, in the language of category theory,  is an object representing the contravariant functor  from the category of coherent sheaves on X to the category of k-vector spaces.

For a normal projective variety X, the dualizing sheaf exists and it is in fact the canonical sheaf:  where  is a canonical divisor. More generally, the dualizing sheaf exists for any projective scheme.

There is the following variant of Serre's duality theorem: for a projective scheme X of pure dimension n and a Cohen–Macaulay sheaf F on X such that  is of pure dimension n, there is a natural isomorphism
.
In particular, if X itself is a Cohen–Macaulay scheme, then the above duality holds for any locally free sheaf.

Relative dualizing sheaf 
,

Example:
If  is a local complete intersection morphism between schemes of finite type over a field, then (by definition) each point of  has an open neighborhood  and a factorization , a regular embedding of codimension  followed by a smooth morphism of relative dimension . Then

Examples

Dualizing sheaf of a nodal curve
For a smooth curve C, its dualizing sheaf  can be given by the canonical sheaf .

For a nodal curve C with a node p, we may consider the normalization  with two points x, y identified. Then the direct image  defines a dualizing sheaf for the nodal curve C. The construction can be easily generalized to nodal curves with multiple nodes.

This is used in the construction of the Hodge bundle on the compactified moduli space of curves: it allows us to extend the relative canonical sheaf over the boundary which parametrizes nodal curves. The Hodge bundle is then defined as the direct image of a relative dualizing sheaf.

Dualizing sheaf of projective schemes
As mentioned above, the dualizing sheaf exists for all projective schemes. In other words, one uses the dualizing sheaf on the ambient Pn to construct the dualizing sheaf on X.

See also 
coherent duality
reflexive sheaf
Gorenstein ring
Dualizing module

Note

References

External links 
http://math.stanford.edu/~vakil/0506-216/216class5354.pdf
Relative dualizing sheaf (reference, behavior)

Algebraic geometry